Hasselquist is a surname. Notable people with the surname include:

Jenny Hasselquist (1894–1978), Swedish ballerina, actress, and ballet teacher
Tuve Hasselquist (1816–1891), Swedish-American Lutheran minister

See also
Fredrik Hasselqvist (1722–1752), Swedish naturalist
Kjell Hasselqvist (born 1949), Swedish sprint canoeist